Hualien or Hualian  may refer to:

Places
Hualien County (Chinese: 花蓮 "lily"), Taiwan Province, Taiwan
Hualien Airport
Hualien railway station
Hualien City, a port city and the seat of Hualien County
Hualien Stadium
Hualien River (花蓮溪) or Hualien River, a small river in Taiwan

Others
Hualian (company) (Chinese: 华联 Huālián "China Union"), Beijing-based supermarket chain
Jing (Chinese opera), a major role type in Chinese opera, also known as Hualian
Hualian (ship name), the major couple/ship in Mo Xiang Tong Xiu's Novel, Tian Guan Ci Fu (TGCF)

See also
 Hua (disambiguation)
 Lien (disambiguation)